Benefit is an unincorporated community in White County, in the U.S. state of Georgia.

History
A post office called Benefit was established in 1899, and remained in operation until 1906. In 1900, the community had 52 inhabitants.

References

Unincorporated communities in White County, Georgia
Unincorporated communities in Georgia (U.S. state)